Xu Yahui (born 10 October 1912, date of death unknown) was a Chinese footballer. He competed in the men's tournament at the 1936 Summer Olympics.

References

External links
 

1912 births
Year of death missing
Chinese footballers
China international footballers
Olympic footballers of China
Footballers at the 1936 Summer Olympics
Place of birth missing
Association football midfielders